William Vincent Hasenzahl (July 7, 1966 – February 11, 2016), known professionally as William Haze, was an American actor, best known as having played Rick, a band manager, on The WB/The CW's hit television show One Tree Hill.  He also starred as RoboDoc in the 2008 film RoboDoc.

Early life
Haze was born in Miami, Florida on July 7, 1966.

Personal life and death
Will Haze was married with no children. On February 11, 2016, Haze died at the age of 49.

Filmography

References

External links
 
 http://willhaze.com

American male film actors
American male television actors
1966 births
Male actors from Tampa, Florida
2016 deaths
Suicides in Florida
2016 suicides